Lucio Battisti, la batteria, il contrabbasso eccetera (Lucio Battisti, the drums, the double bass etc.) is an album by the Italian singer-songwriter Lucio Battisti. It was released in January 1976 by Numero Uno.

The album
The album was Italy's third best selling album in 1976.

Track listing 
All lyrics written by Mogol, all music composed by Lucio Battisti, except where noted.
 "Ancora tu" (Baby It's You) – 4:45
 "Un uomo che ti ama" (A Man Who Loves You) – 6:09
 "La compagnia" (The Companionship) (Lyrics by Mogol, music by Carlo Donida) – 5:51
 "Io ti venderei" (I Would Sell You) – 4:34
 "Dove arriva quel cespuglio" (Where That Bush Is) – 4:13
 "Respirando" (Breathing) – 4:58
 "No dottore" (No, Doctor!) – 5:45
 "Il veliero" (The Sailing Ship) – 6:01
 "Ancora tu (ripresa)" (Baby It's You (reprise)) – 0:38

References

1976 albums
Lucio Battisti albums